Sheloh may refer to:

Rabbi Isaiah Horowitz (c. 1565 – 1630), the Shelah HaKodesh ("the Holy Shelah")
Jewish Released Time, also known as Sheloh (an abbreviation for Shi'urei Limud Hados (Classes for Learning the Religion)), an organization promoting released time for the Jewish education of Jewish children learning in United States public schools